"Circle. Square. Triangle" is a song by Test Icicles which was released as the second single from their debut album For Screening Purposes Only on 24 October 2005. The song is their most successful having peaked at No. 25 on the UK Singles Chart.

Track listing
CD: Domino / DNO 76 - UK

7": Domino / RUG210 - UK

12": Domino / DNO 76 - U.S.

Digital download: Domino

Digital download: Domino

Digital download: Domino

Charts

References

2005 singles
Test Icicles songs
Domino Recording Company singles
2005 songs
Song recordings produced by James Ford (musician)
Songs written by Dev Hynes